This list of Little Einsteins episodes gives the date and plot for each broadcast of the children's television series Little Einsteins during 2005–2010. The series followed on from a direct-to-DVD release, Our Huge Adventure (later rereleased as episodes 27 and 28 of Season 1, "A Brand New Outfit" and "The Missing Invitation" respectively), and was followed by a second double length episode, Rocket's Firebird Rescue in 2010.

Series overview

Episodes

Season 1 (2005–06)

Season 2 (2007–10)

Notes

References

Little Einsteins episodes, List of